G Fuel (stylized in all uppercase as G FUEL), is a brand of caffeinated drink mix sold by Gamma Labs, based in West Babylon, New York. It is marketed as a supplement for gaming that allegedly boosts focus and quickens reaction time.

G Fuel was originally released as a water-soluble caffeinated powder. It has since expanded its line of products, including carbonated versions of flavors in cans and caffeine-free "hydration" flavors, among others.

Overview

A serving of G Fuel contains 140 to 150 mg of caffeine. G Fuel is available in multiple flavors, typically fruit-based, such as fruit punch, green apple, and lemon lime. In addition, G Fuel often collaborates with film production companies, game studios, video game media companies, and musicians, to create custom, promotional flavors.

Controversy
In April 2018, Gamma Labs settled a $118,500 lawsuit with California's Environmental Research Center over lead contamination in their G Fuel products. 18 samples of G Fuel were found to have great enough lead content that warning labels were required, per California's Proposition 65.

In June 2022, Gamma Labs fired seven of its talent managers, citing "restructuring", after a company executive allegedly used a slur and made derogatory statements while on a team call. G Fuel also banned users who mentioned the event from their Twitch live chat. Meanwhile, they have not made an official statement on the event. Several content creators who were partnered with G Fuel announced that they were terminating their partnerships over the incident.

References

External links

Energy drinks